Popești may refer to several places in Romania:

 Popești, Argeș, a commune in Argeș County
 Popești, Bihor, a commune in Bihor County
 Popești, Iași, a commune in Iași County
 Popești, Vâlcea, a commune in Vâlcea County
 Popești, Vrancea, a commune in Vrancea County
 Popești (river), a tributary of the Nadăș in Cluj County
 Popești, a village in Întregalde, Alba
 Popești, a village in Cocu, Argeș
 Popești, a village in Săpata, Argeș
 Popești, a village in Găiceana, Bacău
 Popești, a village in Vasilați, Călărași
 Popești, a village in Baciu, Cluj
 Popești, a village in Melinești, Dolj
 Popești, a village in Logrești, Gorj
 Popești, a village in Cârjiți, Hunedoara
 Popești, a village in Farcașa, Neamț
 Popești, a village in Girov, Neamț
 Popești, a village in Bărăști, Olt
 Popești, a village in Văleni, Olt
 Popești, a village in Brazi, Prahova
 Popești, a village in Podenii Noi, Prahova
 Popești, a village in Dragomirești, Vaslui
 Popești, a village in Miclești, Vaslui
 Popești, a village in Fârtățești, Vâlcea
 Popești, a village in Golești, Vâlcea
 Popești, a village in Lădești Vâlcea
 Popești, a village in Măciuca Vâlcea
 Popești, a village in Nicolae Bălcescu, Vâlcea
 Popești, a village in Sinești, Vâlcea
 Popești, a village in Stoenești, Vâlcea
 Popești, a village in Tetoiu, Vâlcea
 Popești, a district in the town of Mihăilești, Giurgiu
 Popești-Leordeni, a town in Ilfov County